Pay Kuh Mollah (also Romanized as Pāy Kūh Mollāḥ) is a village in Sardasht Rural District, Sardasht District, Dezful County, Khuzestan Province, Iran. At the 2006 census, its population was 34, in 8 families.

References 

Populated places in Dezful County